The Fiat 16-20 HP was introduced by the Italian manufacturer Fiat in 1903.

The car was built in several versions:

 3rd series in 1905, it reverts to 16-20 HP with a wheelbase increased to  - produced 171 copies.
 4th series in 1906, with a new 4503 cc engine  - produced 290 copies.

References 

16-20 HP
Cars introduced in 1903
1900s cars
Veteran vehicles